Jeong Yu-mi may refer to:
 Jung Yu-mi (actress, born 1983)
 Jeong Yu-mi (actress, born 1984)